Bihar Vidyapeeth is an Indian Educational Institution founded by Mohandas Karamchand Gandhi on February 6, 1921 but it was seized by the British in 1942. It was started in Patna by Shri Rajendra Prasad and the land was donated by Maulana Mazharul Haque. Its first Institution was opened at Patna-Gaya road presently known as Buddha Marg. It was inaugurated by Mohammad Ali Jauhar and Kasturba Gandhi along with Mahatma Gandhi. In 2022, It is proposed to make Bihar Vidyapeeth a Central University.

References

External links

Universities in Patna
Universities in Bihar
Universities and colleges in Patna
Indian independence movement in Bihar
Educational institutions established in 1921
1921 establishments in India